Amrik Singh Gill (born 24 April 1951) is a male Indian born former wrestler who competed for Great Britain and England.

Wrestling career
Gill competed at the 1972 Summer Olympics, the 1976 Summer Olympics and the 1980 Summer Olympics. He represented England and won a silver medal in the 57kg bantamweight division, at the 1974 British Commonwealth Games in Christchurch, New Zealand. Four Years later he represented England again and won a bronze medal in the 57kg bantamweight division, at the 1978 Commonwealth Games in Edmonton, Alberta, Canada.

References

1951 births
Living people
British male sport wrestlers
Olympic wrestlers of Great Britain
Wrestlers at the 1972 Summer Olympics
Wrestlers at the 1976 Summer Olympics
Wrestlers at the 1980 Summer Olympics
Wrestlers at the 1974 British Commonwealth Games
Wrestlers at the 1978 Commonwealth Games
Commonwealth Games silver medallists for England
Commonwealth Games bronze medallists for England
Commonwealth Games medallists in wrestling
Medallists at the 1974 British Commonwealth Games
Medallists at the 1978 Commonwealth Games